Charles Watkins Merrifield FRS (20 October 1827 – 1 January 1884, Hove) was a British mathematician.

For the British Association's Section of Mechanical Science, he was in 1875 the Section's Vice-President at the Brighton meeting and then in 1876 the Section's President at the Glasgow meeting. He served on the British Association's committee given the task of reporting on Charles Babbage’s analytical machine. For the London Mathematical Society, he served as Vice-President in 1876–1878, as President in 1878–1880, and as Treasurer in 1880–1882.

Charles was the eldest son of the author and artist Mary Philadelphia Merrifield and brother of the barrister Frederick Merrifield.  His nieces were the classical scholar Margaret Verrall (nee Merrifield) and suffrage campaigner Flora Merrifield.

Selected publications

References

19th-century English mathematicians
1827 births
1884 deaths
Fellows of the Royal Society
Presidents of the London Mathematical Society
Charles